Helen Falls is a waterfall on the Lady Evelyn River within Lady Evelyn-Smoothwater Provincial Park in Northeastern Ontario, Canada.

See also
List of waterfalls

References

Waterfalls of Ontario
Tourist attractions in Nipissing District